Dick's Picks Volume 6 is the sixth live album in the Dick's Picks series of releases by the Grateful Dead. It was recorded on October 14, 1983, at the Hartford Civic Center in Hartford, Connecticut.  The album, on three CDs, contains the complete show from that night. It was released in October, 1996.

This show was the first Grateful Dead concert that Phish guitarist Trey Anastasio attended. Mike Gordon, Phish's bassist, attended separately.  The album was the first to include the song "Keep Your Day Job".

Enclosure

Included with the release is a single sheet folded in half, yielding a four-page enclosure.  The front duplicates the cover of the CD and the back contains a black-and-white photograph of a ticket stub for the event.  The two pages inside contain a wide black-and-white photograph of the band and list the contents of and credits for the release

Caveat emptor
Each volume of Dick's Picks has its own "caveat emptor" label, advising the listener of the sound quality of the recording.  The label for Dick's Picks Volume 6 reads:

"This compact disc has been digitally remastered directly from the original metal cassette. It is a snapshot of history, not a modern professional recording, and may therefore exhibit some technical anomalies and the unavoidable effects of the ravages of time."

Track listing

Disc one
First set:
"Alabama Getaway" → (Garcia, Hunter) – 6:06
"Greatest Story Ever Told" (Hart, Hunter, Weir) – 4:52
"They Love Each Other" (Garcia, Hunter) – 9:10
"Mama Tried" (Haggard) – 2:48
"Big River" (Cash) – 6:31
"Althea" (Garcia, Hunter) – 8:49
"C.C. Rider" (traditional) – 8:01
"Tennessee Jed" (Garcia, Hunter) – 8:33
"Hell in a Bucket" → (Barlow, Weir) – 5:53
"Keep Your Day Job" (Garcia, Hunter) – 5:57

Disc two
Second set:
"Scarlet Begonias" → (Garcia, Hunter) – 14:20
"Fire on the Mountain" (Hart, Hunter) – 16:36
"Estimated Prophet" → (Barlow, Weir) – 13:11
"Eyes of the World" → (Garcia, Hunter) – 17:53

Disc three
"Drums" → (Hart, Kreutzmann) – 5:25
"Spinach Jam" → (Grateful Dead) – 13:05
"The Other One" → (Kreutzmann, Weir) – 6:09
"Stella Blue" → (Garcia, Hunter) – 9:10
"Sugar Magnolia" (Hunter, Weir) – 9:26
Encore:
"U.S. Blues" (Garcia, Hunter) – 5:40

Personnel

Grateful Dead
Jerry Garcia – lead guitar, vocals
Mickey Hart – drums
Bill Kreutzmann – drums
Phil Lesh – electric bass, vocals
Brent Mydland – keyboards, vocals
Bob Weir – guitar, vocals

Production
Dan Healy – recording
Dick Latvala – tape archivist
Jeffrey Norman – CD mastering
Michael Conway – photography
Gecko Graphics – design

Notes

06
1996 live albums